Akhand (also Romanized as Akhand; also known as Ākhownd and Ākhūnd) is a village in Akhand Rural District of the Central District of Asaluyeh County, Bushehr province, Iran. At the 2006 census, its population was 2,492 in 455 households when it was in the former Asaluyeh District of Kangan County. The following census in 2011 counted 2,918 people in 618 households. The latest census in 2016 showed a population of 6,775 people in 906 households, by which time it was in Akhand Rural District of the new county of Asaluyeh; it was the largest village in its rural district.

References 

Populated places in Asaluyeh County